Blue Ridge Mall (North Carolina), a mall in Hendersonville, North Carolina
Blue Ridge Crossing, formerly Blue Ridge Mall, in Kansas City, Missouri

See also
 Blue Ridge Hall